François Le Her (born 10 May 1938) is a French racing cyclist. He rode in the 1965 Tour de France.

References

1938 births
Living people
French male cyclists
Place of birth missing (living people)